Rob Briley (born October 15, 1966, Nashville, Tennessee, United States) is an American politician and a Democratic former member of the Tennessee House of Representatives for the 52nd district, which is part of Davidson County. He is the brother of Nashville politician David Briley and the grandson of Beverly Briley, Metro-Nashville's first mayor.

Education and career

Briley graduated with a Bachelor of Science degree in political science from the University of Colorado in 1991, and obtained his J.D. and from Vanderbilt Law School in 1997.

Briley was elected as a Tennessee state representative beginning with the 101st Tennessee General Assembly (1999–2000). During his 5 term tenure was a member of the House Ethics, Finance, Ways and Means Committee, Rules, Calendar and Rules, and Joint Workers Compensation Committees, and of the House Civil Practice and Procedure, and Criminal Practice and Procedure Subcommittees. He was chair of the Judiciary Committee at the time of his resigning his position as a representative in 2008.

Briley currently works as an attorney. His wife filed for divorce due to his infidelity.

Legislative positions

Briley voted against a bill that would have allowed Tennesseans with gun carrying permits to take their firearms into recreational facilities like state and local parks and playgrounds. He stated that a House bill that would have allowed citizens to carry guns in establishments that serve alcohol was a ploy by Republicans to get Democrats to vote against gun rights. He also stated that the bill shouldn't have been allowed to have been brought up because it was voted down in the same committee the previous year.

Briley came out against a bill that makes it easier for men to end child support payments for children if paternity tests prove the children do not belong to the men.  In the floor debate, Briley said "Yet you want to punish a child as the result of an adulterous situation," said Briley. "You put the child in the position of bearing the burden of a parent's conduct."

Drunk driving incident
Briley allegedly rammed the rear of a truck in Dowelltown, Tennessee on September 8, 2007, after which state troopers cited him for driving under the influence, evading arrest, and violating the implied consent law. The charges arose as a result of his allegedly having tried to escape the officers who pulled him over in Wilson County, starting a chase that, according to Watertown police, topped speeds of over 100 miles per hour (161 km/h). Briley was charged with drunk driving and leaving the scene of the two accidents after Watertown police stopped his vehicle.

During the incident, Briley asked police officers twice, to shoot him in the "fucking head," and he called the Wilson County Sheriff's Department deputies "goddamn Nazis." To one deputy, he said, "You're not an American, are you? You're a goddamn German!" Inside his car, police found a bottle of bourbon and three bottles of pills. Democratic leaders said that he would keep his legislative seat and Judiciary Committee chairmanship for now, though Governor Phil Bredesen said he should step down from his post as chair of the Judiciary Committee. On September 15, 2007, he resigned from his position as chair of the Judiciary Committee. He stated he was being treated at Cumberland Heights alcohol and drug treatment center.

On March 4, 2008, Briley announced that he would not seek re-election to his seat in the state House.

Following these events, Briley admitted that he is an alcoholic during a speech on the floor of the House of Representatives.

Further reading
 Brad Schmitt, 2015, "Ex-state Rep. Rob Briley found God on a linoleum floor," The Tennessean (online), March 6, 2015, see  accessed 28 June 2015.

Legislation sponsored

During his five terms in the House, Rob Briley was the prime sponsor, introducing and passing into law the following pieces of legislation:

101st General Assembly
 HB0302 – Criminal Offenses – Include e-mail and Internet services as means by which person may commit offense of harassment.
 HB0770 – Criminal Procedure – Enacts "Post-Conviction DNA Analysis Act of 2001."
 HB0771 – Workers' Compensation – Requires that person with authority to enter into settlement agreement must attend benefit review conference for both employee and employer's insurer.
 HB0774 – Transportation, Dept. of – Enacts "Transportation Information Planning Act of 2001."
 HB0775 – Transportation, Dept. of – Creates "Transportation Reporting Act of 2001."
 HB0777 – Registers of Deeds – Allows county register to refuse to register any illegible writing and prohibits person seeking registration from affirming that illegible document is best copy unless person submits affidavit setting forth certain information.
 HB0782 – Welfare – Allows state, pursuant to federal statute, to exempt individual convicted of felony involving possession, use, or distribution of controlled substance from federal prohibition against eligibility for Families First program and for food stamps if such individual is in treatment for substance abuse or has completed treatment.
 HB0783 – Civil Procedure – Removes provisions stating woman's action in court of law or equity does not abate by her marriage and that woman's husband may become party plaintiff by motion.
 HB0790 – Fines and Penalties – Clarifies that fine imposed for driving on canceled, suspended, or revoked license due to second or subsequent conviction for vehicular assault, vehicular homicide or driving while intoxicated is not more than $3000.
 HB0792 – Animal Control – Applies dog and cat Humane Death Act to all non-livestock animals; limits methods of euthanizing animals; creates Class A misdemeanor for violations of Act.
 HB0913 – Inheritance Laws – Rewrites and clarifies provisions relative to presumption of death due to seven years' absence.
 HB2509 – Fines and Penalties – Clarifies that fine imposed for violation of reduced speed limit while construction workers are present is not less than $250 and no more than $500.
 HB2511 – Business and Commerce – Places certain notice and disclosure requirements on covered employer who establishes drug-free workplace.
 HB2619 – Correctional Programs – Provides that judge of circuit or criminal court as well as general sessions court order misdemeanor sentenced to county jail or workhouse be placed on work release.
 HB0776 – Registrars of Deeds – Requires preparer of instrument to leave blanks in recital for book and page number for register of deeds to complete if deed or other instrument from grantor received equitable interest is received simultaneously with instrument on which recital is required.

[102nd General Assembly]
 HB0978 – County Officers – Authorizes county register of deeds in Davidson County to institute automated registering of deeds and other instruments from remote locations, such instruments to be received, approved and recorded in register's system.
 HB0979 – Municipal Government – Declares graffiti on public property or visible from publicly owned property to be public nuisance which may be abated by civil action or suit in circuit or chancery court; Authorizes municipalities to use municipal funds to remove graffiti under certain circumstances.
 HB1453 – Workers' Compensation – Requires department of labor and workforce development to produce annual report listing employers that fail to provide workers' compensation coverage or are self- insured; report to be provided to advisory council of workers' compensation, oversight commission on workers' compensation and chair.
 HB1454 – Motor Vehicles, Titling and Registration – Authorizes issuance of new specialty earmarked plates for Special Olympics; earmarks portion of revenues from sale thereof to Tennessee Special Olympics.
 HB2565 – Guardianship – Permits court to approve or confirm compromise of claim filed on behalf of minor or disabled person even if action or suit claim is not pending.
 HB2572 – Fiduciaries – Adds decedent's issue to list of nonresident persons who may serve as personal representative of estate of decedent.
 HB2578 – Employees, Employers – Requires employer to have drug-free workplace program if employers has more than five employees and provides or contracts to provide construction services to state or local government.
 HB2581 – Insurance Companies, Agents, Brokers, Policies – Include attorney fees as additional expenses, loss or injury potentially recoverable by plaintiff in action against an insurance company for bad faith failure.
 HB2582 – Employees, Employers – Allows employee who prevails in cause of action against employer for retaliatory discharge to recover reasonable attorney fees and costs if employee terminated solely for refusing to participate in, or refusing to remain silent about, illegal activities.
 HB2583 – Animals – Enacts "T-Bo Act."
 HB2584 – Taxes – Establishes franchise, excise tax credit for certain unbudgeted property taxes associated with low income housing tax credit program property.
 HB2883 – Liens – Extends period allowed for execution of judgment lien from three to ten years.
 HB3156 – Animals – Enacts "The Tennessee Spay/Neuter Law."
 HJR0876 – Memorials, Recognition – Grand Ole Opry, 75th Anniversary.
 HB0779 – Employees, Employers – Creates "False Claims Act." 
 HB0784 – Insurance Companies, Agents, Brokers, Policies – Requires Insurers to provide policyholder with written statement setting forth certain rights each time such policyholder files claim for structural damage valued at $20,000 or more.
 HB0785 – Contracts – Prohibits use of forms or contracts for goods and services that claim to waive consumer's right to obtain punitive, exemplary or treble damages, or attorney's fees; specifies that such prohibited provisions are unconscionable and unenforceable.
 HB0789 – Judgments – Clarifies that judgment lien created by registration lasts for time remaining in 10-year period from date of final judgment entry at county clerk's office and that no judgment lien expiring on or before May 17, 2000, may be revived by registration.
 HB1562 – Unclaimed Property – Requires operator of establishment to notify treasurer of property found on establishment after holding such property for 180 days; limits authorization for establishment operators to donate found property to charitable organization to situations where treasurer does not request to take custody within 45 days of receiving notice of property.
 HB2618 – Courts, General Sessions – Confers upon master of environmental court of Davidson County same authority of general sessions judge to issue process and conduct proceedings to which master is assigned.
 HB2933 – Criminal Procedure – Provides that post-conviction defender is authorized to represent death-sentenced inmate in clemency proceedings and other ancillary actions necessary to protect constitutional rights of inmate prior to execution.
 HB2941 – Corporations, For Profit – Authorizes health care providers to be co-investors in professional corporation or professional limited liability company.
 HJR0086 – General Assembly, Confirmation of Appointment – Jeanette Rudy, Wildlife Resources Commission.
 HJR0283 – Memorials, Sports – Marcus Horton, TSSAA Heavyweight Wrestling State Champion.
 HR0215 – Memorials, Academic Achievement – T.E. Sweeney Scholarship Program Members.
 HB0786 – Workers' Compensation – Loss of eyes, etc., Mental Faculties.

[103rd General Assembly]

 HB0406 – Safety – Clarifies that nothing in child safety belt law prevents mother from attending to the  child's other physiological needs; restores language removed from child restraint law in the 102nd General Assembly.
 HB0407 – Courts, Creation – Creates new chancellor position and two new criminal court judge positions in the 20th judicial district with such positions to be filled by appointment of governor.
 HB0408 – Safety – Transfers approval of training for public safety dispatchers from TEMA to emergency communications board.
 HB0887 – Energy – Defines energy resource recovery facility to clarify that energy produced in such facilities should not be subject to local sales and use tax in counties with metropolitan form of government.
 HB1135 – Hospitals and Health Care Facilities – Revises penalties for and regulation of nursing home facilities.
 HB1472 – Zoning – Allows continuation of certain uses of structures, and on and off site signs not in conformance with local government zoning.
 HB1473 – Emergency Communications Districts – Provides for payment of emergency communications fee by certain mobile radio service providers or retailers.
 HB1474 – Law Enforcement – Enacts "General Patton Act of 2002."
 HB1569 – Collection Agencies – Allows collection service to take assignment of accounts, bills, notes or other indebtedness for the purposes of billing, collecting, or filing suit in certain circumstances.
 HB2098 – Insurance, Health, Accident – Grants commissioner of commerce and insurance same authority to regulate hospital and medical service corporations as commissioner possesses for other health insurers; imposes minimum of one-year waiting period before such service corporation may convert to for-profit entity and require board of directors of such service corporation to meet same statutory requirements as imposed on boards of not-for-profit corporation.
 HB2258 – Autopsies – Requires autopsy reports to be completed within 60 days of submission of the body where homicide suspected and within 90 days of submission in all other cases; person responsible for report must make written explanation if such report not completed within required time period and send it to the next of kin and person requesting autopsy.
 HB2350 – TennCare – Provides for $50.00 personal needs allowance without affecting person's eligibility for low-income long-term nursing home care; funds through reduction in payments for items unrelated to quality of care.
 HB2659 – Criminal Procedure – Allows local law enforcement agencies and clerks of court to create process for electronic submission of final dispositions for criminal cases to Tennessee Bureau of Investigation.
 HB2661 – Loan Companies and Short Term Lenders – Requires pawnbrokers accepting pawned items to obtain a more specific description of the pledged goods than is currently required by mandating the brand, model and serial numbers, size, color, precious metal type, gemstone description, and detailed description of firearms be gathered.
 HB3041 – Civil Procedure – Enacts the "Commonsense Consumption Act."
 HB3090 – Motor Vehicles – Specifies that if a party to a civil action is not the parent or legal guardian, then evidence of a failure to use a child restraint system may be admitted.
 HB3131 – Physicians and Surgeons – Prohibits physicians and osteopathic physicians licensed in Tennessee from entering into agreement with laboratory to pay for lab services and include the charges in the bill  sent to the patient unless certain requirements are met.
 HB3182 – Sexual Offenses – Enacts the "Tennessee Serious and Violent Sex Offender Monitoring Act."
 HB3252 – Tort Liability – Requires medical malpractice insurers to submit information to department of commerce and insurance regarding claims and lawsuits on forms prescribed by the department.
 HB3387 – Malpractice, Professional – Requires all health care facilities, not just hospitals, to report to the board of medical examiners certain disciplinary actions concerning physicians.
 HB3389 – Alcoholic Beverages – Allows any art gallery to serve wine to patrons at no charge if such art gallery does not sell food or beverages and receives 90 percent of its revenue from the sale of artwork.
 HB3391 – Criminal Offenses – Rewrites the offense of communication theft, punishes offense as theft, provides civil remedies and statutory damages, combines present offense of cable television theft.

[104th General Assembly]

 HB0005 – Gas, Petroleum Products, Volatile Oils – Authorizes commissioner of agriculture to establish standards for kerosene and motor fuels if necessary to protect the general welfare; if standards are set by commissioner for more than a year, rules must be promulgated relative to such standards.
 HB0207 – Juries and Jurors – Requires sequestered jurors to be paid at least $30.00 a day.
 HB0216 – Day Care – Removes prohibition on parents using drop-in centers when going to work and increases the number of hours per day for a child in a drop-in facility from six to seven and the hours per week for such facility from 10 to 14; establishes guidelines for drop-in centers accepting school-aged children on "snow days".
 HB0217 – Litter Control – Extends for additional six years to June 30, 2010, the temporary tax on bottles of soft drinks and barrels of beer to fund programs for the prevention and collection of litter.
 HB0384 – Sexual Offenses – Extends deadline from December 31, 2004, to June 30, 2005, for board of probation and parole to contract with vendor providing monitoring services; extends deadline from March 1 to April 1, 2006, for board of probation and paroles to report on implementation of Tennessee Serious and Violent Sex Offender Monitoring Pilot Project Act to joint meeting of judiciary committees and correction oversight committee.
 HB0449 – Consumer Protection – Extends the exemption from the Consumer Protection Act for nonprofit health clubs that are tax-exempt to include non-profit health clubs that operated as part of a licensed nonprofit hospital exempt from taxation.
 HB0662 – Mortgages – Removes from definition of "mortgage loan broker" person who for compensation processes or offers to process mortgage loans for others.
 HB0965 – Election Laws – Exempts Davidson County from provisions governing petitions for recall in local elections.
 HB1276 – Public Funds and Financing – Expands authorized investments, types of deposits, and places for deposit of funds held by governmental entities.
 HB1348 – Human Rights – Adds Davidson County chancery court as venue for persons seeking a court order requiring records be produced in human rights cases.
 HB1373 – Sheriffs – Clarifies the duty of a sheriff to suppress all affrays, riots, routs, unlawful assemblies, insurrections, or other breaches of the peace and the authority to summon to such sheriff's aid as many of the inhabitants of the county as such sheriff thinks proper; requires the sheriff to patrol county roads, ferret out crimes, secure evidence, and apprehend and arrest criminals and to furnish the necessary deputies to carry out duties.
 HB1684 – Economic and Community Development – Provides for the creation of a film production advisory committee to study film production in the state.
 HB2088 – Taxes, Sales – Delays the implementation of the streamlined sales tax laws to July 1, 2007, which were to take effect July 1, 2005; directs that the state officials designated as delegates to the multi-state discussions on the streamlined sales and use tax agreement study certain issues.
 HB2174 – Emergency Communications Districts – Specifies that the executive director of the emergency communications board shall be considered assistant commissioner (executive service) for civil service purposes.
 HB2193 – Emergency Communications Districts – Revises training requirements for public safety dispatchers.
 HB2196 – Tennessee Regulatory Authority – Requires that Tennessee Regulatory Authority to direct the posting of a bond or other security by a public utility providing wastewater service or for a particular project proposed by a public utility providing wastewater service; such posting could also satisfy security requires by department of environment and conservation for person proposing to build or operate a sewer.
 HB2200 – Children – Requires health care professionals to test newborns within one hour of birth to determine glucose levels; violation is a class C misdemeanor.
 HB3949 – Judges and Chancellors – Prohibits judicial evaluation commission members from eligibility for nomination by the judicial selection commission during such member's tenure on the judicial evaluation commission and two year thereafter.
 HB3951 – Motor Vehicles – Makes offering, paying or receiving a kickback between a towing firm and an owner or manager of property in exchange for referring a motor vehicle for towing from the property a Class C misdemeanor.
 HB3952 – Education, Higher – Clarifies that reasonable membership dues to a not-for-profit buying cooperative not considered payment or compensation for purpose of prohibiting an institution of higher learning form making purchases through group purchasing program.
 HB3954 – Lottery, Corporation – Requires corporation to establish a lottery ticket litter reduction program.

[105th General Assembly]

 HB0311 – Probation and Parole – Requires governor to appoint three members of the private probation services council instead of the chief justice of the supreme court. – Amends TCA Section 16-3-905.
 HB0312 – Courts, Supreme Court of Tennessee – Increases fee for filing of notices with supreme court clerks, except the fee assessed to the state in criminal appeals, from $4.00 to $6.00; fees assessed to the state in criminal appeals limited to $4.00. – Amends TCA Section 8-21-501.
 HB0374 – Education – Specifies rights of parties involved in special education due process hearings. – Amends TCA Title 49, Chapter 10, Part 6.
 HB0422 – Animals and animal cruelty – Establishes as element of cruelty to animals offense knowingly tying, tethering, or restraining dog in manner that results in the dog suffering bodily injury. – Amends TCA Title 39, Chapter 14, Part 2.
 HB1327 – Public Defenders – Clarifies prior service credits for assistant district public defenders. Amends TCA Title 8, Chapter 14 and Title 9, Chapter 4.
 HB1329 – Municipal Government – Reinstates provisions specifying traffic offenses that municipalities may adopt by ordinance and offenses that are strictly state offenses. – Amends TCA Title 16, Chapter 8, Part 3 and Title 55, Chapter 10, Part 3.
 HB1335 – Motor Vehicles – Increases penalties for offense of failing to yield the right of way in violation of specified right of way statutes that result in serious personal injury or death. – Amends TCA Title 55.
 HB1337 – Charitable Solicitations – Revises various provisions relative to structure of charitable organizations that solicit contributions. – Amends TCA Title 48, Chapter 101, Part 5.
 HB1684 – Courts- Increases the number of members composing the advisory committee established under the Drug Court Treatment Act of 2003 from five to seven; requires that two members be judges who have presided over a drug court for at least two years and that two members be drug coordinators who have functioned as drug coordinators in actively implementing drug courts for at least two years. – Amends TCA Title 16.
 HB2151 – Victims' Rights – Removes requirement that notice to the district attorney general and alleged offender of a claim filed with the criminal injuries compensation fund be in writing and accompanied with copies of such materials as is included in the claim or in support thereof; removes provisions for payment from fund for state residents who were victims of terrorist act or mass violence outside this country. – Amends TCA Section 29-13-104; Section 29-13-108(c) and Section 29-13-109(c).
 HB2162 – General Assembly – Creates special committee to study the administration of the death penalty.
 HB2165 – Cemeteries – Authorizes cemetery companies to receive court relief from paying into improvement care trust fund when the court determines such trust fund is sufficiently large.- Amends TCA Title 46.
 HB2232 – Commerce and Insurance, Dept. of – Authorizes the commissioner to assess a civil penalty of up to $1,000 per violation, not to exceed $100,000, against an insurance company for each separate violation of a statute, rule, or order, unless another civil penalty amount is specifically provided for in the applicable statute, rule, or order; amount of authorized penalty increased to $25,000 per violation, not to exceed $250,000, when person knowingly violated statute, rule, or order. – Amends TCA Title 56, Chapter 2, Part 3.
 HB2255 – Insurance Companies, Agents, Brokers, Policies – Revises provisions governing unfair replacement transaction practices; authorizes insurers to use the mortality tables adopted by NAIC for certain purposes. – Amends TCA Title 26, Chapter 7 and 8.

References

Democratic Party members of the Tennessee House of Representatives
1966 births
Living people
University of Colorado alumni
Vanderbilt University alumni